Einarsson is an Icelandic surname, meaning son of Einar' an Old Norse name meaning 'one warrior'. In Icelandic names, the name is not strictly a surname, but a patronymic. Notable people with the name include:

Björn Einarsson (born 1978), Swedish bandy player
Gissur Einarsson (1512–1548), Icelandic Protestant clergyman; first Lutheran bishop in Iceland
Gylfi Einarsson (born 1978), Icelandic professional football player
Magnús Einarsson (1092–1148), Icelandic Roman Catholic clergyman; Bishop of Skálholt 1134–48
Mats Einarsson (born 1960), Swedish politician; member of the Riksdag 1998–2006
Per Einarsson (born 1984), Swedish bandy player
Sigfús Einarsson (1877−1939), Icelandic composer
Sveinn Einarsson (born 1934), Icelandic theater director
Thorfinn Turf-Einarsson, Earl of Orkney (died 963), Earl of Orkney
Ulf Einarsson (born 1981), Swedish bandy player
Vilhjálmur Einarsson (1934–2019), Icelandic Olympic athlete